The Last White Christmas was a music festival held in Pisa, Italy on December 4, 1983. Several albums were released with recordings from the event. A 35th anniversary event was held in 2018.

Last White Christmas
The Last White Christmas music festival was held in Pisa, Italy on December 4, 1983: the day of Saint Barbara. The church hosted the first GDHC initiatives until July 1894 when the circle Victor Charlie opened. 

In one of the bands that performed at festival also played Fefo Forconi then with Toxic Reasons.

Albums 
The recording of the concert (six hours), engineered by Alessandro Sportelli and Alessandro Paolucci via a cassette tape deck "wired directly to soundboard, no ambience mics ..." (Alessandro Sportelli interview), was later released by Bad Compilation Tapes / Borderless Countries Tapes of San Diego February 1984, in two volumes titled BCT #6 Last White Christmas I and BCT #7 Last White Christmas II as a co-release with Cessophonya Records of Jim Plumbago in Italy. About half the tracks were used. These two live albums were later reissued on CD in 2000 by BCT (Bad Compilation Tapes) in conjunction with Schizophrenic Records of Hamilton (Ontario, CA), Enterruption of San Francisco (California, U.S.), Ponk-111 of Walnut Creek (California, U.S.) and Human Stench of Pittsfield (Massachusetts, U.S.) with a few extra tracks. Limited edition: 500 pressed each.

Last White Christmas tracks

Some record productions made with recordings taken from Last White Christmas vol.I and vol.II:
 Raw Power (tape, BCT, USA, 1984)
 Senza Tregua (tape, Ribelli Uniti Records, ITA, 1984)
 Last White Christmas (cd, Bad Compilation Tapes, Schizophrenic Records and Human Stench, USA & Canada, 2000)
 Last White Christmas II (cd, Bad Compilation Tapes, Schizophrenic Records and Human Stench, USA & Canada, 2000)
 Senza Tregua: Granducato Hardcore (LP, Enterruption, BC Tapes & Records, Schizophrenic Records and Ponk-111, USA, 2002)
 Urla Dal Granducato Vol. 1 (LP, Area Pirata, ITA, 2003)
 Urla Dal Granducato Vol. 2 (LP, Area Pirata, ITA, 2006)
 Last White XMas (double CD, Area Pirata, ITA, 2020)

Reception

Legacy 
Ten tracks taken from the recording of the concert were published on the album Urla dal Granducato by Area Pirata Records in 2003.

In December 2018, the 35th anniversary of Last White Christmas was celebrated with the LWC35 concert in the historic Lumiere cinema of Pisa, the first cinema to be opened in Italy (1899). Among the guests of concert were polemica of Hilary Blinder, ex drummer of Sabot. In the cinema hall, there was an exhibition of 35 posters made by Italian and international graphic designers and illustrators for the 35th anniversary of the concert. Among the artists who participated with their own work created for the 35th anniversary of the concert there were: Winston Smith, Craig Henning, John Yarbrough (designer of the cover of the first concert release on cassettes), Tuono Pettinato, Vittore Baroni, Giuseppe Palumbo and Prof.Bad Trip.

In June 2020, the Italian label Area Pirata re-released the Last White Christmas concert thanks to the granting of the reprint rights free of charge by Chris Chacon of BCT.

Bibliography

References

External links 
 Flipside, No. 41 (1983) LWC p. 47
 Maximum Rocknroll, No. 12 (March 1984) LWC review by Tim Yohannan p. 73
 Maximum Rocknroll, No. 14 (June 1984) LWC photoreport p. 52
 Maximum Rocknroll, No. 18 (October 1984) Chris Chacon interview pp. 22–23
 Maximum Rocknroll, No. 220 (September 2001) LWC I in the top 10 by Rob Coons p. 141
 Maximum Rocknroll, No. 233 (October 2002) LWC II p. 133
 BCT (Borderless Countries Tapes/Bad Compilation Tapes) San Diego, CA
 Last White Christmas I on Discogs
 Last White Christmas II on Discogs
 Italian Hardcore Scum Explosion! by Stuart Schrader
 LWC Zine, 1984
 LWC35 (1983-2018)
 LWC35 vol.01
 LWC35 vol.02 (with texts by Vittore Baroni/Blow Up and Chris Chacon/BCT)

1983 festivals in Europe
Festivals in Italy
Pisa